Aqraba is a Syrian village located in the Markaz Rif Dimashq District of Rif Dimashq Governorate. Aqraba had a population of 6,799 in the 2004 census.

References

Populated places in Markaz Rif Dimashq District
Villages in Syria